SS Ridge Park was a steam ship built in 1878 in England and registered in Australia. It was used to transport coal, other goods and passengers by the Black Diamond Line of Adelaide. It sank on 10 February 1881 after hitting the Beware Reef, Cape Conran, Victoria, Australia.

References

1878 ships
Shipwrecks of Victoria (Australia)
Ships built on the River Wear
Maritime incidents in February 1881